Sedlice is a town in Strakonice District in the South Bohemian Region of the Czech Republic. It has about 1,300 inhabitants. The town centre is well preserved and is protected by law as an urban monument zone.

Administrative parts
Villages and hamlets of Důl, Holušice, Mužetice and Němčice are administrative parts of Sedlice.

Geography
It lies mostly in the southern tip of the Benešov Uplands.

History

The first written mention of Sedlice is from 1352. From 1352 to 1399, Sedlice was a property of Bavors of Strakonice. In the first half of the 15th century, a Gothic fort was built. During the 16th century, Sedlice prospered and developed, and in 1539, the settlement was promoted to a town. In the second half of the 16th century, the fort was rebuilt to a Renaissance castle with a moat.

Economy
The town has a tradition of lace production. The tradition started in the 15th century. It reached its greatest expansion in the 19th and early 20th centuries, and continues to this day.

Sights
The Church of Saint James the Great was built in the Baroque style in 1747–1752, on the site of an old temple from the 14th century.

The castle is one of the landmarks of the town, but today it is dilapidated and inaccessible to the public.

References

External links

Cities and towns in the Czech Republic
Populated places in Strakonice District
Prácheňsko